The following is a List of Prisoner cast members, ordered by number of episodes they appeared in. This list contains actors from the Australian television series Prisoner.

List of Prisoner cast

The following list includes actors who were regular credited cast members that appeared in 20 or more episodes of the series.

See also
 List of Prisoner characters – prison staff
 List of Prisoner characters – inmates
 List of Prisoner characters - miscellaneous

Notes

References

Prisoner
Prisoner